Kertajati International Airport is an airport in West Java, Indonesia that serves as a second international airport for the Greater Bandung and Cirebon metropolitan areas,as well as parts of the West Java and Central Java provinces.

The airport began operation on 24 May 2018 when the Indonesia One presidential aircraft landed at the airport. A grand opening took place in July 2019. The new airport functions as a buffer to help ease air traffic at Soekarno–Hatta International Airport. Upon completion, the airport will have a total capacity of 29 million passengers annually, with additional space for expansion. The airport will also operate cargo terminals with an official estimate of 1.5 million tons of cargo by 2020.

Development
In order to ensure completion of Kertajati Airport, construction of Karawang Airport has been put on hold and Kertajati was fast-tracked for completion. The 1,800 hectares airport is estimated to cost Rp 25.4 trillion. The plan includes three 60-meter-wide runways (measuring 3000, 3750 and 4025 meters) capable of accommodating large aircraft such as the Airbus A380, Boeing 747-8, and Airbus A350. The airport is also to be equipped with the technology needed to handle the most recent and modern aircraft, such as the Boeing 787. The project will include a 3,400-hectare aerotropolis known as Kertajati Aerocity. Twice the size of the airport, this aerotropolis is to be a center of economic growth and is located north of the Cipali Toll Road, east of the Manuk River.

Project implementation consists of five phases: preparation (2015), phase I (2015-2020), phase I-II (2016-2025), and purpose phase III and IV after 2025. During Phase I, the project focused on airport development. Phases I-II are Kertajati Aerocity development, phase III will be the growth of Kertajati as aerotropolis, and as the final phase, Kertajati Aerocity will act as an enabler of the sustainable economic center. Based on the strategic development plan, in addition to regular large passenger jet and cargo flights, the airport facilities have been optimized for Low Cost Carriers (LCC) and Hajj flights to Saudi Arabia. This will eventually shift Bandung and West Java passengers and traffic to Kertajati, alleviating congestion at Soekarno–Hatta Airport, .

The airport currently features a single runway with the apron capable of accommodating 22 aircraft. In April 2019, work extending the runway to 3000 metres was completed, and wide bodies such as Boeing 747s have landed.

Terminal
Citilink was the first airline to obtain permission to fly the Kertajati-Juanda route, starting in June 2018 and using an Airbus A320 aircraft.

Airlines and destinations

Passenger

Cargo

Statistics

Ground transportation

Several bus companies, including Perum DAMRI and private operators provide services from the airport to various destinations of West Java roundtrip. Damri Airport bus is free-of-charge (until the next Christmas/holiday season or Eid season).

Damri Airport Bus tickets to Bandung cost Rp 75,000 and to Cirebon cost Rp 40,000. The central government is currently providing a transportation subsidy by operating free Damri buses for one year, from Karawang, Cirebon and Bandung. The airport will be accessed by Cisumdawu Toll Road, which is now under construction and expected to be completed by 2020. The airport is also connected to Cikampek-Palimanan Toll Road with an extension.

Train routes of Bandung-Garut and Cianjur-Bandung will also be forwarded to Kertajati Airport for accessibility support. Although still pushing for high speed rail project that will extend from Bandung to the airport, PT Bandara Internasional Jawa Barat (BIJB) and Railink have signed an MOU to build rail tracks and airport train system, when necessary.

Criticism
During the soft opening, the airport suffered from mismanagement owing to lack of passengers utilizing the airport. The airport has been criticized by passengers and airlines due to its remoteness and lengthy distance from the city of Bandung that it served. Vice President Jusuf Kalla also criticize the local authority for not doing proper research when developing the airport. Similarly Indonesian Ombudsman criticized failures and lack of effort by the airport company, BIJB in consulting airlines when developing the airport. Poor occupancy caused Indonesia's national airline Garuda Indonesia to eventually pull out of the airport in September 2019. The airport's poor access have also been blamed for declining hotel and restaurant revenue in Bandung, as many tourists from outside Java island shun Bandung.

Notes

References

Airports in West Java